The nominees for the 2015 Ovation Awards aka the 26th Annual LA STAGE Alliance Ovation Awards were announced on September 24, 2015 by the Los Angeles Stage Alliance.  The list of nominations was published on their online magazine, @ This Stage.

The awards were presented for excellence in stage productions in the Los Angeles area from September, 2014 to August, 2015 based upon evaluations from 240 members of the Los Angeles theater community. The Ovation Awards are the only peer-judged theater awards in Los Angeles.

The winners were announced on November 9, 2015 in a ceremony at the Ahmanson Theatre in Los Angeles, California.  The ceremony was hosted by actors Vanessa Claire Stewart and French Stewart.

Awards 
Winners are listed first and highlighted in boldface.

Ovation Honors 

Ovation Honors recognize outstanding achievement in areas that are not among the standard list of nomination categories.

 Composition for a Play – Mat Sweeney & Ellen Warkentine – The Temptation of St. Antony – Four Larks
 Fight Choreography – Mike Mahaffey – She Kills Monsters – Loft Ensemble	
 Puppet Design – Ted Blegen – She Kills Monsters – Loft Ensemble

References 

Ovation Awards
Ovation
2015 in Los Angeles
Ovation